Richard B. Weidman (born March 31, 1940) is an American politician in the state of Iowa.

Weidman was born in Kansas City, Missouri and is a retired state trooper. A Republican, he served in the Iowa House of Representatives from 1991 to 2003 (97th district from 1991 to 1993 and 86th district from 1993 to 2003).

References

1940 births
Living people
Politicians from Kansas City, Missouri
Republican Party members of the Iowa House of Representatives